Corazzano is a village in Tuscany, central Italy, administratively a frazione of the comune of San Miniato, province of Pisa. At the time of the 2001 census its population was 331.

Corazzano is about 50 km from Pisa and 15 km from San Miniato.

References 

Frazioni of the Province of Pisa